Hamiet Bluiett (September 16, 1940 – October 4, 2018) was an American jazz saxophonist, clarinetist, and composer. His primary instrument was the baritone saxophone, and he was considered one of the finest players of this instrument. A member of the World Saxophone Quartet, he also played (and recorded with) the bass saxophone, E-flat alto clarinet, E-flat contra-alto clarinet, and wooden flute.

Biography
Bluiett was born just north of East St. Louis in Brooklyn, Illinois (also known as Lovejoy), a predominantly African-American village that had been founded as a free black refuge community in the 1830s, and which later became America's first majority-black town. As a child, he studied piano, trumpet, and clarinet, but was attracted most strongly to the baritone saxophone from the age of ten. He began his musical career by playing the clarinet for barrelhouse dances in Brooklyn, Illinois, before joining the Navy band in 1961. He attended Southern Illinois University Carbondale.

In his mid-twenties, Bluiett heard Harry Carney (the baritone player in the Duke Ellington band) play in a live concert in Boston, which also made a strong impression on the young Bluiett, providing an example of a baritone saxophonist who played as soloist rather than accompanist.

Following his time in the Navy, he returned to the St. Louis area in the mid-1960s. In the late 1960s Bluiett co-founded the Black Artists' Group (BAG) of St. Louis, Missouri, a collective dedicated to fostering creative work in theater, visual arts, dance, poetry, film, and music.  He led the BAG big band during 1968 and 1969.

In late 1969, Bluiett moved to New York City, where he joined the Charles Mingus Quintet and the Sam Rivers large ensemble.  In 1972, Bluiett joined Charles Mingus and toured to Europe with him. He would often play off and on with him, leaving at some points to play with another band, but would come back a year later. In 1974, Bluiett returned to Mingus and played in quintet alongside George Adams. He also performed in Mingus at Carnegie Hall. He continued to play with Mingus until 1975, when he left to make his own recordings as a leader.

In 1976 he co-founded the World Saxophone Quartet, along with two other Black Artists' Group members, Julius Hemphill and Oliver Lake, as well as multi-reedist David Murray.

He has remained a champion of the somewhat unwieldy baritone saxophone, organizing large groups of baritone saxophones.  In the 1980s, he also founded the Clarinet Family, a group of eight clarinetists playing clarinets of various sizes ranging from E-flat soprano to contrabass.  Since the 1990s Bluiett led a quartet, the Bluiett Baritone Nation, made up entirely of baritone saxophones, with drum set accompaniment.

Bluiett also worked with Babatunde Olatunji, Abdullah Ibrahim, Stevie Wonder, and Marvin Gaye.

He returned to his hometown of Brooklyn, Illinois, in 2002 but moved back to New York City in 2012. In his final years, he performed at gigs, including the New Haven Jazz Festival on August 22, 2009. He performed with students from Neighborhood Music School in New Haven, Connecticut. The group were known as Hamiet Bluiett and the Improvisational Youth Orchestra. He died in St. Louis, Missouri on October 4, 2018 after a period of declining health.

Discography

As leader
1976: Endangered Species (India Navigation)
1977: Bars (Musica)
1977: Resolution (Black Saint)
1978: Birthright (India Navigation)
1979: Im/Possible to Keep (India Navigation)
1981: Dangerously Suite (Soul Note)
1984: Ebu (Soul Note)
1987: The Clarinet Family (Black Saint)
1991: If You Have To Ask You Don't Need To Know (Tutu)
1993: Nali Kola (Soul Note)
1993: Sankofa / Rear Garde (Soul Note)
1994: Bearer of the Holy Flame (Black Fire)
1995: Young Warrior, Old Warrior (Mapleshade)
1996: Bluiett's Barbecue Band (Mapleshade)
1997: Live at the Village Vanguard - Ballads & Blues (Soul Note)
1997: Makin' Whoopee: Tribute to the King Cole Trio (Mapleshade)
1997: Hamiet Bluiett & Concept: Live at Carlos 1 (Justin Time, 1997)
1997: Hamiet Bluiett & Concept: Live at Carlos 1: Another Night (Justin Time, 1997)
1998: Hamiet Bluiett & Concept: Live at Carlos 1: Last Night (Justin Time, 1998)
1998: Bluiett Baritone Saxophone Group Live at the Knitting Factory (Knitting Factory)
1998: Bluiett Baritone Nation: Libation for the Baritone Saxophone Nation (Justin Time)
1999: Join Us (Justin Time) (with D. D. Jackson and Mor Thiam)
2000: With Eyes Wide Open (Justin Time)
2001: The Calling with D. D. Jackson and Kahil El'Zabar
2002: Blueblack

With the World Saxophone Quartet

As sideman
With The 360 Degree Music Experience
In: Sanity (Black Saint, 1976)
With Lester Bowie
The Great Pretender (ECM, 1981)
With Anthony Braxton
New York, Fall 1974 (Arista, 1974)
With James Carter
Conversin' with the Elders (Atlantic, 1996)
Out of Nowhere (Half Note, 2005)
With Andrew Cyrille
Route de Frères (Tum, 2011)
With Gil Evans
Live at the Public Theater (New York 1980) (Trio, 1981)
Bud and Bird (Electric Bird/King, 1986 [1987])
Farewell (Evidence, 1986 [1992])
With Craig Harris
F-Stops (Soul Note, 1993)
With Abdullah Ibrahim
The Journey (Chiaroscuro, 1977)
With Charles Mingus
Mingus at Carnegie Hall (Atlantic, 1974)
With the Music Revelation Ensemble
In the Name of... (DIW, 1994)
Knights of Power (DIW, 1996)
With David Murray
Now Is Another Time (Justin Time, 2003)
With Sam Rivers' Rivbea All-star Orchestra
Culmination (BMG France, 1999)
With Malachi Thompson
Talking Horns (Delmark, 2001) with Oliver Lake

References

External links
"A Fireside Chat With Hamiet Bluiett" by Fred Jung, from Jazz Weekly site
Audio Recordings of WCUW Jazz Festivals - Jazz History Database

1940 births
2018 deaths
Avant-garde jazz musicians
Jazz baritone saxophonists
Musicians from St. Louis
People from Brooklyn, Illinois
India Navigation artists
World Saxophone Quartet members
Deaths from cerebrovascular disease
The 360 Degree Music Experience members
Human Arts Ensemble members
Justin Time Records artists
Mapleshade Records artists
20th-century saxophonists